Churashevo (Suraş) is a rural locality (a village) in Sultanbekovsky Selsoviet, Askinsky District, Bashkortostan, Russia. The population was 233 as of 2010. There are 4 streets.

Geography 
Churashevo is located 47 km east of Askino (the district's administrative centre) by road. Kamashady is the nearest rural locality.

References 

Rural localities in Askinsky District